The moustached antpitta (Grallaria alleni) is a species of bird placed in the family Grallariidae.

It is found in Colombia and Ecuador. Its natural habitat is subtropical or tropical moist montane forests. It is threatened by habitat loss.

References

External links
BirdLife Species Factsheet.

moustached antpitta
Birds of the Colombian Andes
Birds of the Ecuadorian Andes
moustached antpitta
Taxonomy articles created by Polbot